Inchiquin Lough is a freshwater lake in the Mid-West Region of Ireland. It is located in The Burren of County Clare.

Geography and hydrology
The lake lies along the River Fergus.

Natural history
Fish species in Inchiquin Lough include brown trout, pike, rudd, perch, tench. The lake is part of the East Burren Complex Special Area of Conservation.

See also
List of loughs in Ireland

References

External links
 The Legend of Lake Inchiquin

Inchiquin